Atla is a village in Rampurhat I CD Block in Rampurhat subdivision of Birbhum district, West Bengal, India. It is famous for being the birthplace Bamakhepa, a saint of India.

Education
According to the 2011 census, the literacy rate of Atla village was 72.62%, with male literacy at 79.90% and female literacy at 64.71 %. Recently Atla village came into news for efforts made by Mohanananda Brahmachari Charitable Foundation community centre with help from Haven Charity, UK, to impart Information Technology skills to students.

References

Villages in Birbhum district